110 East is a  tall 23 story office building currently under construction in South End Charlotte, North Carolina.

History 

The 2-acre site made up of 2 parcels was purchased by Stiles Corp. and Shorenstein Properties in October for $21.5 million.  The site is right next to the East/West Boulevard station light rail station.  It will be the only office building in Charlotte with direct light rail access.  The building architect, Hastings Architecture, coordinated with Charlotte Area Transit System to ensure a seamless transition between the building and the light rail station.  The building will be in a very active area of the South End neighborhood that has a lot of restaurants and nightlife within a short walk.  The former parking lot was used for parking for the buildings in front of it that housed restaurants Tupelo Honey and The Manchester.  The two buildings were included in the $21.5 million purchase.  Both Tupelo Honey and The Manchester have relocated since the project was announced.

It was originally planned to break ground in mid 2020 and complete in the fall of 2022.  However, due to the COVID-19 pandemic this was pushed back. On January 12 the Stiles website announced the groundbreaking for January 26th, 2022.  Matt Knisely, Managing Director at Shorenstein, stated "We are proud to continue our long-standing partnership with Stiles on another industry-leading office asset.  Charlotte remains an attractive market, and we are pleased to expand our growing footprint in this exciting city. The location and amenities at 110 East will provide companies with the high-quality resources they need to perform at the highest level of excellence."  Justin Siemens, President of Stiles Carolinas stated "We are pleased to again be working with the talented teams at Shorenstein and Hastings and remain highly committed to South End and the Charlotte market. We look forward to bringing a Class A office project of the highest caliber to this vibrant community." 

Due to the size of the lot floors 2 to 10 will be devoted to a 914-space parking deck.  The 11th floor will feature  of amenities such as  fitness center, flexible conference spaces, and a terrace along with a sky lobby.  Floors 12 to 23 will be office space with  floorplates.  The Hastings Architecture websites states that the interior of the building design uses art to guide building tenants throughout the space and attempts to maximize the Uptown skyline views.  The building is currently pursuing LEED Silver and Wired Certification. The building is a speculative building, meaning no tenants had signed prior to the building breaking ground.  Although Cushman & Wakefield, the company leasing the building, has indicated that several companies have called about the space and have toured the city.

See also
 South End
 List of tallest buildings in Charlotte, North Carolina

References

Office buildings in Charlotte, North Carolina